Trinità dei Monti (TdM) is an independent and nonprofit think tank based in Rome, Italy. It was de facto founded by Pierluigi Testa in February 2012. The group is composed of more than 400 members (50 of whom are founding members).

Trinità dei Monti is a discussion group which meets at the foot of the Spanish Steps in Rome with a view to gaining further insight into topical issues regarding economics, financial markets, banking as well as Italian politics and European politics. There is an active participation of expert speakers from public authorities, the banking world, enterprises and universities.

History

Since February 2012 Trinità dei Monti has organized a series of institutional meetings with a general view to promoting positive economic, business, banking and financial culture as well as fostering such culture in the course of time in order to instil confidence in the public bodies and to create a large pool of skills for the current and future establishment.

In 2018, TdM expanded, and it opened a new satellite centre in Naples. In 2019, the think tank organised an event with the Swiss Embassy to Rome, to talk about economic and cultural relations between Switzerland and Southern Italy.

Objectives

 Analysis and discussion on topics that regard the economy, law, domestic and international politics, labour, banking and finance, and business during regular meetings held with the objective to generate debate on (and focus considerable attention towards) issues of direct interest for both Italy and the European Union.
 Formulation and delivery of concrete proposals for development of the economy and management of socio-economic policies regarding our country to the bodies of the Italian Government and to the main players in the industry.
 Development of international relations with a view to facilitating dialogue and development of synergies with governmental, industrial and academic entities. The think tank has already established relationships with several foreign countries, including the United States of America, the United Kingdom, France, Switzerland, Poland, Georgia, and Hungary.
 Promoting excellence and unleashing the potential of young professionals through coaching and their engagement in the institutional initiatives.
 To meet women professionals on a regular basis in the framework of meetings called ‘Womenomics’.
 To gain an in-depth insight into certain issues relating to the political and economic history of Italy.

Research

Research focuses on the following thematic areas:
       economics and fiscal policy
	European Union politics 
	Human rights and Humanitarian crisis 
	Geopolitics (United States, Latin America, Asia, Africa)
	Mediterranean and Middle East (specifically Turkey)
	Security and defence
	Energy and climate
	Multilateralism and global governance (international political economy)
	Italy's foreign policy
	Technology, Cybersecurity and AI
	international relations

The research staff is made up of around 30 researchers, including students from a variety of Universities in Continental Europe, such as the University of Kent, the London School of Economics, Sciences Po Lille, LUISS, University of Naples Federico II, University of Cambridge, University of Warwick Sapienza University of Rome, University of Helsinki and Bocconi University. Think Tank Trinità dei Monti has also been actively involved in the organisation of events in some of these universities.

The Think Tank is an active participant in important international initiatives, such as the Economic Forum in Krynica and the Pontignano Conference on Italy–United Kingdom relations

See also 
 Think tanks in Italy
 List of think tanks
 Foreign relations of Italy

References

External links

Think tanks based in Italy
Foreign policy and strategy think tanks
Political and economic think tanks based in the European Union
Think tanks established in 2012
2012 establishments in Italy